Washingborough is a village in the North Kesteven district in Lincolnshire, England.
The population in the 2001 census was 3,356, increasing to 3,482 at the 2011 census.   It is situated on the lower slopes of Lincoln Cliff limestone escarpment where the River Witham breaks through it. The south side of  Lincoln Cathedral and its three towers can be seen from the village centre.

Geography

Washingborough is the point on the River Witham at which the Lincolnshire Fens begin. The Fens were first drained by the Romans and the Roman Car Dyke ran from Washingborough to the River Nene, near Peterborough.

History
The origin of the name 'Washingborough'  is uncertain but is thought to mean either 'fortification near the wash' or 'fortification of the people of Wassa'.

There is a war memorial to the men of Heighington and Washingborough in the church.

A dig involving Channel 4's archaeological television programme Time Team, on a site adjacent to the modern canalised course of the River Witham, found evidence of an important late Iron Age settlement of around 1000 BC. At this time the river was tidal and the evidence suggests a trading and metal working centre with trading connections to northern Europe. Copper ore and ingots were found as well as evidence of smelting in crucibles. The settlement may have lost importance as water levels rose and the site became unsuitable. Much of the settlement site was destroyed when the river was canalised in the 18th century as part of the effort to drain the Fens.

The parish church is dedicated to St John the Evangelist. St John's Church has a Norman tower, and inside the church is a Norman font. Church windows depict a Zeppelin raid on the village in 1916.  An Iron Age shield was discovered near here in 1826. It is called the Witham Shield and is now in the British Museum.

The village was served by the Lincolnshire Loop Line between Lincoln and Peterborough via Boston and Spalding. However, the station that served the village closed in 1940 to passengers and never reopened. The line closed to freight traffic in the 1970s and is now a trail called the "Water Rail Way" between Lincoln and Woodhall Junction.

Amenities
The village has two public houses, the Ferryboat on High Street and the Hunters Leap on Oak Hill, a Chinese and an Indian takeaway, a pizza house, fish and chip shop, supermarket and post office with chemists.

The Powell hut is the home of scouting and guiding in the village.
The Peterborough to Lincoln Line passes through the south-west corner of the village.

Education
Washingborough Academy is the village primary school. The school gained a good rating in their Ofsted reports in 2017, 2012 and 2009 inspection.

Twin village
  Orgerus in Yvelines, northern France.

References

External links

 Washingborough Primary School
 Village history
 Parish council
 Washingborough on Time team
 Washingborough Archaeology Group
 

Villages in Lincolnshire
Civil parishes in Lincolnshire
Archaeological sites in Lincolnshire
Bronze Age sites in Lincolnshire
North Kesteven District